The One McKinley Place is a high-end residential condominium located across Pacific Plaza Towers in Bonifacio Global City, Philippines. The 43-storey building was completed in 2004 and rises to 149 metres (489 feet) from the ground to its architectural top. It was the tallest single residential tower in Bonifacio Global City until the completion of The Infinity Fort Bonifacio in 2011.

History
One McKinley Place began groundbreaking and excavation in 1997, with first concrete pouring in 1998. It began to rise in January 1999. It topped off in January 2000. One year later, construction stopped for a while but resumed in 2002 and was completed in 2003. The building opened in 2004. It was the tallest single tower in Taguig from 2004 to 2011, when The Infinity Fort Bonifacio was completed.

Popular culture
 In 2006, it is featured on Imago's Taralets Music Video as a background alongside Pacific Plaza Towers.

Gallery

References

 Resumes work 2002

External links
 One McKinley Place at Emporis

Skyscrapers in Bonifacio Global City
Residential skyscrapers in Metro Manila
Residential buildings completed in 2004